The Catalina Swimwear Building is a six-story, industrial building located in Downtown Los Angeles. The building was designed in 1923 by architect William Douglas Lee and is Lee's first major commission as an independent architect in Los Angeles. The façade has Neoclassical features and articulation that reflect early twentieth-century architecture, more formal than typical for a building intended for manufacturing purposes. The Catalina Swimwear Building is located on the southwest corner of San Pedro and Winston Streets. The building is of reinforced concrete construction, and the upper façade is sheathed in a Flemish Bond brick pattern. Its construction is documented by City of Los Angeles Building Permit #38140, issued for a six-story building with a concrete frame on the southwest corner of San Pedro and Winston Streets.

History 
It was the headquarters for Catalina Swimwear (one of the oldest clothing manufacturers in California) from 1923 to 1960, at which time the company moved to the City of Commerce.

Present day 
The Catalina Swimwear Building, now called The Catalina, was sold in 2016 and is in the process of being renovated into 78 live/work lofts to restore its historic fabric. "Work will include removing stucco from the ground floor façade to reveal original terracotta, adding a rooftop gym and possibly putting up a sign for the Catalina Swimwear Company as a way of honoring the structure’s history."

References 

Office buildings in Los Angeles
Buildings and structures in Downtown Los Angeles
Commercial buildings completed in 1923
Industrial buildings completed in 1923
1923 establishments in California